William Charles Winshaw, was an American physician who created Stellenbosch Farmer's Winery (SFW) in South Africa in 1935. He was born in Kentucky, USA on 21 November 1871 and died in South Africa on 11 March 1968. He also co-owned the Oude Libertas vineyard there and produced Lieberstein, a dry white wine. He was married to Ada Charlotte (Day) and Susan Valerie

SFW merged with Distillers Corporation on December 4, 2000 to form Distell Group Limited.

See also
South African wine
List of wine personalities

References

External links
History of South African Wine

Wine merchants
1871 births
1968 deaths